The Convergence for Alternance and Change (Convergence pour l'Alternance et changement) is a political party in Mali. It includes the Sudanese Union-African Democratic Rally (Union Soudanaise-Rassemblement Démocratique Africain) and the Party for National Rebirth (Parti pour la renaissance nationale)
At the last legislative elections, 14 July 2002, the party won 10 out of 160 seats.

Political parties in Mali